Art Bleeds is the first album by Italian technical death metal band Gory Blister. Originally an Independent record, it was re-issued by Sekhmet Records in November 2003.

Track listing

"Primordial Scenery" – 4:01
"As Blood Moves" – 3:25
"Art Bleeds"  – 3:09
"Mermaids Beloved"  – 1:21
"Anticlimax"  – 3:13
"Cognitive Sinergy"  – 3:49
"Snowfall"  – 3:03
"A Gout From the Scar"  – 3:25
"Comet... and Her Trail of Spiritual Dust" - 3:54
"Never Let Me Down (Depeche Mode cover)" - 3:46

Credits
Dome – vocals
Raff Sangiorgio – guitar
Bruce Teah – bass
Joe La Viola – drums
Alberto Cutolo – remastering
B-Lial – illustrations
Bruce Teah and Gory Blister – producer, 
Gabriele Ravaglia and Riccardo "Paso" Pasini - engineer

Notes and references

1999 albums
Gory Blister albums